Frank E. Gillette was one of the last judges appointed to the Supreme Court of Oklahoma Territory. He was appointed by President Theodore Roosevelt in 1902, and served until the court was abolished after statehood was granted to Oklahoma on November 16, 1907. Born in Ashtabula County, Ohio, on January 7, 1848, Gillette had moved with his parents to Emporia, Kansas when he was thirteen. After graduating from high school, he earned a degree from Kansas State Normal School then studied law and began to practice his profession in Hutchinson, Kansas in May, 1876. He moved to Kingman, Kansas and entered politics in 1882, where he was elected to the state legislature, representing Kingman County, and served for three terms. He was on the House Judiciary Committee, spending the last two years as chairman of that committee. He then was elected to the state senate and served for four years, which included serving as chairman of the Senate Judiciary Committee. At the end of his senatorial term, he moved to Oklahoma Territory and settled in El Reno where he opened a private law practice.

On May 2, 1902, Congress created two additional positions on the Oklahoma Territory Supreme Court. President Theodore Roosevelt appointed Gillette to one court seat, and J. L. Pancoast of Blackwell, Oklahoma, was appointed to the other new position

The Oklahoma Republican Party nominated Gillette as Associate Justice of the new Oklahoma Supreme Court.  He did not win, but got the second highest number of votes of any Republican candidate on the ballot. He then joined the law firm of Gillette, Libby and Gillette in El Reno. When Oklahoma was admitted as a state in 1907, he was appointed as the Republican member of the Oklahoma Election Board.

Notes

References 

1848 births
1923 deaths
Place of death unknown
People from Emporia, Kansas
People from Kingman, Kansas
Members of the Kansas House of Representatives
Emporia State University alumni
People from El Reno, Oklahoma
Oklahoma lawyers
Oklahoma Territorial Supreme Court justices
People from Ashtabula County, Ohio